Apachita (Aymara and Quechua for the place of transit of an important pass in the principal routes of the Andes and for a stone cairn, a little pile of rocks built along the trail in the high mountains, also spelled Apacheta) may refer to:

 
 Apachita (Arequipa), a mountain in the Arequipa Region, Peru
 Apacheta-Aguilucho volcanic complex, a group of volcanoes associated with a geothermy project in Chile
 Apachita (Chayanta), a mountain in the Chayanta Province, Potosí Department, Bolivia
 Apachita (Ingavi), a mountain in the Ingavi Province, La Paz Department, Bolivia
 Apachita (Inquisivi), a mountain in the Inquisivi Province, La Paz Department, Bolivia
 Apachita (Pando), a mountain in the José Manuel Pando Province, La Paz Department, Bolivia
 Apachita (Puno), a mountain in the Puno Region, Peru
 Apachita (Potosí), a mountain in the Potosí Department, Bolivia